Kavandampalayam is a panchayat village in Gobichettipalayam taluk in Erode District of Tamil Nadu state, India. Kavandampalayam has a population of about 3103.

References

Villages in Erode district